Calostilbe is a genus of ascomycete fungi in the family Nectriaceae.

External links
 

Nectriaceae genera
Taxa named by Paul Sydow
Taxa named by Pier Andrea Saccardo